Tom Valenti is the Executive Chef at Jockey Hollow Bar and Kitchen in Morristown NJ. Chef Valenti was formerly the owner and Executive Chef of Oxbow Tavern on the Upper West Side of Manhattan. He is the former  Executive Chef of Le Cirque Restaurant in Midtown Manhattan, in New York City. Previously, he was Executive Chef and co-owner of Ouest Restaurant on the Upper West Side of Manhattan which shuttered in 2015. The recipient of many awards for his comfortable cooking style, Valenti is best known for his salmon gravlax and slow-cooked meats, particularly braised lamb shanks. Chef Valenti is the author of 3 cookbooks, "Welcome to my Kitchen", "Soups, Stews and One Pot Meals" as well as "You Don't Have to be Diabetic to Love This Cookbook", dedicated to recipes for diabetic diets. Valenti was the driving force behind the creation of the Windows of Hope Family Relief Fund, established to benefit the surviving family members of foodservice-related victims of the September 11, 2001 attacks.

Professional life

Introduction to haute cuisine
After graduating from high school, Valenti took a job working pastry at a local Ithaca French restaurant, l'Auberge du Cochon Rouge. Exposure to the traditional Escoffier style of French cooking led him to relocate to Rye, New York where he accepted a job as a private chef to a wealthy family. He was free to design the menu as he pleased with the stipulation that the same meal not be repeated for at least 200 days. This job lasted for 2 years until the couple employing him divorced.

Valenti next landed a position at the Greenwich, Connecticut restaurant being opened by famous French chef Guy Savoy. Savoy took note of Valenti's culinary abilities and sent him over to his signature restaurant in Paris, France to further his skills over the next 15 months.

Gotham Bar & Grill
Upon completion of his internship at Savoy's Paris restaurant, Valenti departed France via Charles de Gaulle Airport where a friend introduced him to Alfred Portale who was returning from his own culinary study period. Shortly after returning to the US, Portale took control of his now famous restaurant, Gotham Bar & Grill, and hired Valenti as his first sous-chef. It was here that Valenti put to use the precision culinary skills he had developed during his time in France. Valenti would remain at Gotham for 2 years.

Executive Chef
During his time at Gotham, Valenti became friends with the front-of-house manager, Alison Becker. Soon they would collaborate to open Alison on Dominick, Valenti's breakout opportunity as Executive Chef. In 1989, Esquire magazine called their venture "Best New Restaurant" in New York City. In 1990, Food & Wine magazine named Valenti one of the "Ten Best New Chefs" in the country.

In 1994, after 5 years and much critical acclaim, Valenti and Becker parted ways and he assumed the Executive Chef position at Cascabel where he worked for 2 years before taking off some time from the rigors of kitchen work. In 1998, Valenti assumed the lead position at Ken Aretsky's Upper East Side bistro Butterfield 81. Critical acclaim was almost immediate. New York Times food critic Ruth Reichl declared Valenti a "clairvoyant in the kitchen", describing his "meat-oriented dishes" as "offering exactly what I wanted to eat." New York magazine's Gail Greene waxed poetic about the "mythic lamb shanks." Valenti would run the kitchen for 2 years before departing to work on his own venture.

Ouest
In the spring of 2001, Valenti opened his signature restaurant Ouest on the corner of Broadway and 84th street in Manhattan's Upper West Side. The French style menu was reminiscent of his days at Butterfield 81, focused on lesser cuts of meat with bold flavors. A converted dry cleaner store, the "L-shaped" interior layout was remodeled by designer Peter Neimetz, focusing on cozy leather booths and soft lighting with balcony alcoves. The New York Times awarded Ouest 2 stars, saying that the "main courses drift toward the comfort zone." New York magazine, in a 3-star review, declares that "Valenti has honed the menu to the point where almost every dish resonates with love-it-in-an-instant flavors." Ouest is frequently credited with bringing haute cuisine to the Upper West Side. Ouest closed it doors on June 13, 2015.

Oxbow Tavern
In March 2018, Valenti opened "Oxbow Tavern" on Columbus Ave at 71st St in Manhattan's Upper West Side neighborhood.

Windows of Hope
Following the September 11, 2001 attacks, Valenti assembled his good friends Waldy Malouf of Beacon, Michael Lomonaco of Windows on the World and attorney-restaurant financier David Emil, establishing the Windows of Hope Family Relief Fund dedicated to benefit the surviving family members of victims from the foodservice industry. A "Dine Out" date of October 11, 2001 was established to generate fund contributions. Originally intended as a citywide restaurant response to a need within their community, news of the event soon spread to other cities and eventually over 5,000 restaurants around the world participated in contributing proceeds from that evening to the fund. Corporate sponsors also contributed to Windows of Hope and, in total, over $23 million were raised to help the families in need.

In 2005, Valenti continued his charitable efforts in helping to lead the Restaurants for Relief effort to benefit victims of Hurricane Katrina.

Other ventures
In 2003 Valenti opened 'Cesca at Broadway & 75th Street. The menu, a tribute to the cooking style he learned in his grandmother's kitchen, was decidedly Italian in nature and quickly gained notoriety and acclaim. Valenti ran the kitchen at 'Cesca for 3 years until an egregious decision by his business partner led Valenti to sever their relations, trading his interest in 'Cesca for full control of Ouest.

Valenti holds a small interest in the New York location of Dinosaur Bar-B-Que, a traditional barbecue restaurant situated under the Riverside Drive bridge on 125th St.

On October 28, 2008, Valenti opened his new restaurant The West Branch at Broadway and W. 77th St. in New York City. The restaurant was attached to the On The Ave Hotel. This restaurant shuttered in August 2010.

Signature dishes
 Braised Lamb Shanks
 Salmon Gravlax

Television
 The Martha Stewart Show – 3 episodes
 The Today Show – 3 episodes
 The Early Show – 7 episodes
 Boy Meets Grill - 1 episode

Books
Valenti has authored several cookbooks, including:
 Tom Valenti: Welcome to My Kitchen: A New York Chef Shares His Robust Recipes and Secret Techniques William Morrow Cookbooks, 
 Tom Valenti: Tom Valenti's Soups, Stews, and One-Pot Meals: 125 Home Recipes from the Chef-Owner of New York City's Ouest and 'CescaScribner, 
 Tom Valenti: You Don't Have to be Diabetic to Love This Cookbook Workman,  June 2009

Awards
 Food & Wine Magazine - Best new Chef (1990) 
 James Beard Foundation - Best Chef of New York Nominee (2004)
 James Beard Foundation - Best New Restaurant Nominee (2004)
 New York Magazine - Top 10 Chefs of the Year (2002)
 New York Magazine – Best Italian Restaurant (2004)

Personal life

Early life in Ithaca
Valenti was born March 27, 1959, in Ithaca, New York to Louis and Aurora Valenti. His father left at an early age and Valenti was raised by his mother and Italian immigrant maternal grandparents. It was after school in his grandmother Nonni's kitchen that Valenti first learned the craft of cooking traditional Italian dishes.

Fly-fishing in the Catskills
Valenti is described as a chef who "cooks to live", preferring to spend his time fishing the Beaverkill River in Upstate New York where he owns a small seasonal fishing cabin. He exclusively practices catch and release angling.

Family
Valenti lives in Northern New Jersey with his wife Lawson Harris (Valenti) their dog Lily and Maine Coon Cat Cosmo.

External links

Businesses
 Le Cirque
 Dinosaur Bar-B-Que
 Private Event Cooking at Great Chefs of New York

Articles
 New York magazine March 4, 2002
 New York magazine May 21, 2005
 Crave New York May 24, 2005
 New Yorker magazine July 2, 2018

Image gallery
 Diana DeLuca at Restaurant Insider
 Peter Bond at Flickr.com

Interviews
 New York Times December 10, 2003
 New York Post April 26, 2007
 Resident Publications June 12, 2007
 The Daily Gullet March 27, 2002
 Restaurant Insider August 2006
 Restaurant Insider September 2008

References

External links

1959 births
American male chefs
American people of Italian descent
Living people
American television chefs
American food writers
Writers from New York City
American cookbook writers